Magasa may refer to places in:

Greece
 Magasa, Crete, a neolithic settlement

Italy
 Magasa, Lombardy, a comune in the Province of Brescia